Odontosia is a genus of moths of the family Notodontidae erected by Jacob Hübner in 1819.

Selected species
Odontosia carmelita (Esper, [1798])
Odontosia sieversii (Menetries, 1856)
Odontosia elegans (Strecker, 1885)
Odontosia grisea (Strecker, 1885)

References

Notodontidae